The Rough Guide to the Music of South Africa is a world music compilation album originally released in 1998. Part of the World Music Network Rough Guides series, the album spotlights the music of South Africa. Liner notes were written by Tom Andrews and Rob Allingham, a discographer and music historian specializing in South Africa. Phil Stanton, co-founder of the World Music Network, was the producer. This was the first of two similarly named albums: the second edition, featuring approximately half of the same artists, was released in 2007.

Critical reception

Raymond McKinney of AllMusic wrote that "newcomers would find much to savour" in the album.

Track listing

References

External links 
 

1998 compilation albums
World Music Network Rough Guide albums
World music albums by South African artists